Admiral is a four-star naval flag officer rank in the Indian Navy. It is the highest active rank in the Indian Navy. Admiral ranks above the three-star rank of vice admiral and below the five-star rank of admiral of the fleet, which has never been awarded or held.

An admiral may be referred to as a full admiral or four-star admiral to distinguish them from lower flag officer ranks like vice admiral and rear admiral.

The rank is held by the Chief of the Naval Staff (CNS), the professional head of the Indian Navy, since 1968. The rank may also be held by the Chief of Defence Staff (CDS) if the holder is a serving Indian Navy flag officer. Admiral Adhar Kumar Chatterji was the first Indian officer to hold the rank of full admiral. The current Chief of the Naval Staff (CNS) and only full admiral in the Indian Armed Forces is Admiral R. Hari Kumar.

The equivalent rank in the Indian Army is general and in the Indian Air Force is air chief marshal.

Insignia
The flag of an admiral is a Saint George's Cross upon which is superimposed a navy-blue Dharmachakra (Wheel of Law).

The badges of rank have a crossed sword and baton over four eight-pointed stars and the Ashoka emblem above, on a golden shoulder board. An admiral wears gorget patches which are golden patches with four white stars and additional oak leaves under them. In addition to this, the double-breasted reefer jacket has four golden sleeve stripes consisting of a broad band with three narrower bands.

Appointment and term length
Appointments to the office of CNS are made by the Appointments Committee of the Cabinet (ACC), which is chaired by the Prime Minister of India.

The term length of the Chief of Naval Staff is three years or until the age of 62 of the holder, whichever is earlier.

Order of precedence
An admiral ranks at No. 12 on the Indian order of precedence, along with the CDS and the Chiefs of Staff of the Indian Army and Indian Air Force (the COAS and the CAS). An admiral is at pay level 18, equivalent to Cabinet Secretary of India (at No. 11 on the warrant of precedence), with a monthly pay of ₹250,000 (US$3,500).

See also
 Chief of the Naval Staff
 List of serving admirals of the Indian Navy
 Naval ranks and insignia of India

References

Bibliography

India Navy
Indian Navy
Military ranks of the Indian Navy
Four-star officers